Hanna-Barbera Superstars 10 is a series of 10 syndicated made-for-television  animated films produced by Hanna-Barbera Productions as part of The Funtastic World of Hanna-Barbera programming block from 1987 to 1988, featuring the studio's popular animated characters: Yogi Bear, The Flintstones, The Jetsons, Scooby-Doo, Huckleberry Hound and Top Cat. The first 8 films used traditional cels, while the last 2 films used digital ink and paint.

Films

Crew
 Executive Producers: William Hanna and Joseph Barbera
 Directors: Arthur Davis, Oscar Dufau, Bob Goe, John Kimball, Don Lusk, Charles A. Nichols, Ray Patterson, Jay Sabry, Paul Sommer, Carl Urbano, Rudy Zamora
 Executive in Charge of Production: Jayne Barbera
 Creative Designer: Iwao Takamoto
 Show Editor: Gil Iverson
 Supervising Director: Ray Patterson
 Character Designer: Scott Jeralds
 Casting Director: Andrea Romano
 Recording Director: Gordon Hunt
 Graphics Iraj Paran, Tom Wogatzke
 Music Composed and Conducted by: Hoyt Curtin, Sven Libaek
 Director of Music Supervision: Joanne Miller

Home media
All of the films except Yogi and the Invasion of the Space Bears were released on VHS shortly after their original broadcasts by Worldvision Home Video (a sister division of then-Hanna-Barbera owner Taft Broadcasting), Invasion of the Space Bears finally saw a VHS release in 1991. To date, the Yogi Bear and Scooby-Doo television movies in the series have been released on DVD from Warner Home Video. On December 7, 2010, Warner Bros. released Yogi's Great Escape on DVD via their Warner Archive Collection. This is a Manufacture-on-Demand (MOD) release, available exclusively through Warner's online store and only in the U.S. Warner Home Video also released Scooby-Doo Meets the Boo Brothers on DVD, in Region 1 on May 6, 2003. and Scooby-Doo and the Ghoul School on DVD, in Region 1 on June 4, 2002.

The Jetsons Meet the Flintstones has been released on VHS three times, first by Worldvision Home Video in 1988, then by Kid Klassics, the children's video arm of GoodTimes Entertainment (using the same cassette as the previous release) on October 20, 1989, and later by Warner Home Video on July 3, 2001. The film was finally released on DVD for the first time on June 14, 2011.

On , Yogi Bear and the Magical Flight of the Spruce Goose was released on VHS videocassette in the United States. On December 7, 2010, Warner Home Video released Yogi Bear and the Magical Flight of the Spruce Goose on DVD via their Warner Archive Collection, a Manufacture-on-Demand (MOD) label, available exclusively through Warner's online store and only in the U.S. As of August 2011, all of the Hanna-Barbera Superstars 10 episodes are available on DVD through Warner Archive. While all 10 movies have appeared on Cartoon Network and Boomerang, a cable channel primarily dedicated to classic Hanna-Barbera material, only the Scooby-Doo films in the series still appear in regular rotation on Cartoon Network and Boomerang, as part of Cartoon Theatre on Cartoon Network and Boomerang Theatre. All 10 films were also released on VHS videocassette since they have aired on Cartoon Network since the 1990's.

As of 2014, all 10 movies have been made available on DVD; apart from the Scooby-Doo movies, all of the others are available on demand through the Warner Archive Collection, direct from Warner Bros. or Amazon.com.

Stations

See also
 The ABC Saturday Superstar Movie
 The Funtastic World of Hanna-Barbera
 List of works produced by Hanna-Barbera Productions

References

Film series introduced in 1987
1980s American animated films
Animated film series
Hanna-Barbera animated films
American television films
1987 animated films
1987 films
1988 animated films
1988 films
Films based on television series
Animated films based on animated series
 
The Funtastic World of Hanna-Barbera
Television films based on television series